"Someone to Hold" is a song co-written and performed by American contemporary R&B singer Trey Lorenz. It was also written and produced by Mariah Carey and Walter Afanasieff. It is the opening track from his eponymous debut album and also was issued as the album's first single on August 27, 1992 by MCA Records. The song was his only hit on the Billboard Hot 100 as a solo artist, peaking at #19 in 1992.

European releases of the song were backed with "Wanna Girl," Lorenz' original version of a song which became an international hit in 1993 for Jeremy Jordan.

Music video
The official music video for the song was directed by Michael Borofsky.

Personnel
 Trey Lorenz: lead vocals, songwriter
 Mariah Carey: songwriter, vocal arranger, background vocals
 Walter Afanasieff: songwriter, producer, arranger, keyboards, acoustic guitar, Synclavier programming
 Dan Shea: assistant producer, keyboards, drum programming, Mini Moog bass, synthesizer
 Ren Klyce: Akai AX80 and Synclavier programming
 Gary Cirimelli: MacIntosh and Synclavier programming
 Michael Landau: guitar
 Audrey Wheeler, Cindy Mizelle, Will Downing: background vocals

Charts

References

External links
 
 

1992 songs
1992 debut singles
1990s ballads
Trey Lorenz songs
MCA Records singles
Pop ballads
Contemporary R&B ballads
Song recordings produced by Walter Afanasieff
Song recordings produced by Mariah Carey
Songs written by Walter Afanasieff
Songs written by Mariah Carey
Songs written by Trey Lorenz
Soul ballads